Beware! Children at Play (also known as Goblins, Caution! Kids Are Playing, Warning! Children and Attention! Enfants and originally styled as Beware: Children at Play) is a 1989 American  independent horror film directed by Mik Cribben and distributed by Troma Entertainment.

Plot
The film follows the inhabitants of a small rural town in New Jersey whose children are disappearing at an alarming rate and whose adults are simultaneously being killed in a ritualistic fashion. It is revealed early on that the kids are being inducted into a cannibalistic cult that live in the woods. The cult is somehow inspired or influenced by the legendary tales from the Old English epic poem Beowulf.

Cast
 Michael Robertson as John DeWolfe
 Rich Hamilton as Ross Carr
 Robin Lilly as Cleo Carr
 Lori Romero as Julia DeWolfe (credited as Lori Tilgrath)
 Jamie Krause as Kara DeWolfe
 Mik Cribben as Isac Braun

Reception
The film is one of Troma's most controversial titles due to its gruesome finale, a sequence in which the townspeople brutally murder each of the cannibalistic children using firearms, pitchforks, and other assorted weapons. According to Lloyd Kaufman, when the film's trailer played at the Cannes Film Festival before a screening of Tromeo and Juliet, nearly half of the theatre walked out in protest.

See also
 Who Can Kill a Child? – a 1976 Spanish horror film
 Children of the Corn (film series)

References

External links
 
 Beware! Children at Play at the Troma Entertainment movie database

1989 films
1989 horror films
American independent films
Troma Entertainment films
American horror thriller films
Films about cannibalism
1980s English-language films
1980s American films